Kavango East is one of the fourteen regions of Namibia. Its capital is Rundu, its governor is Bonifatius Wakudumo. The Region was created in 2013 when the Kavango Region was split into Kavango East and Kavango West. The only self-governed settlements in Kavango East are the capital Rundu and the village of Divundu.

The region contains the western half of the Caprivi Strip. In the north, Kavango East borders the Cuando Cubango Province of Angola, and in the south and southeast the North-West District of Botswana. Domestically, it borders the following regions:
Zambezi – east
Otjozondjupa – southwest
Kavango West – west

Because of its rather high rainfall compared to most other parts of Namibia and its location on the Kavango River after which it was named, this region has agricultural potential for the cultivation of a variety of crops, as well as for organised forestry and agro-forestry, which stimulates furniture making and related industries. Kavango East and its sister region Kavango West are nevertheless the poorest regions in Namibia.

Politics
The Fourth Delimitation Commission of Namibia, responsible for recommending on the country's administrative divisions suggested in August 2013 to split the Kavango Region into two. Then-president Hifikepunye Pohamba enacted the recommendations. As a result, two new regions of Kavango East and Kavango West were created. As of 2020, Kavango East had 80,450 registered voters.

Administrative division
The region is subdivided into six electoral constituencies:
 Mashare
 Mukwe
 Ndiyona
 Ndonga Linena
 Rundu Rural
 Rundu Urban

In the 2015 regional elections SWAPO won in all six constituencies and obtained 79% (2010: 73%) of all votes. In the 2020 regional election SWAPO was still the strongest party but its support dropped to 62% of the popular vote, and it lost Rundu Rural to an independent candidate.

Governors
 Samuel Mbambo (2013–2020)
 Bonifatius Wakudumo (2020–present)

Transport
There is a particular dearth of north-south roads in the Region, apart from the Rundu-Grootfontein main road. Rundu has a small airstrip to accommodate medium-sized tourist or cargo aircraft in daylight only. The poor condition of the roads and the long distances had a negative effect on tourism; this situation was improved by the completion of the Trans–Caprivi Highway. A major highway connecting Rundu to western Kavango and the Ohangwena Region is under construction.

References

External links

 
Regions of Namibia
States and territories established in 2013
2013 establishments in Namibia